MaryJanice Davidson is an American author who writes mostly paranormal romance, but also young adult literature and non-fiction.
She is the creator of the popular Undead series. She is both a New York Times and USA Today bestseller.
She won a 2004 Romantic Times Reviewers’ Choice Award
and was nominated for the same award in 2005. Davidson lives in Minnesota with her husband and two children.  She grew up on military bases and moved often, as she was the child of a United States Air Force soldier.  Pamela Clare of USA Today wrote, "It's Davidson's humor, combined with her innate storytelling ability and skill with dialogue, that has lifted her from small presses to the big best-seller lists."

Bibliography

Undead series 
Elizabeth "Betsy" Taylor turns thirty in the most unfortunate manner possible: she is laid off from work and then run down by an SUV. Waking up in the morgue fails to improve her mood, and when she discovers she can't kill herself, she gets downright belligerent. Being proclaimed "Queen of the Vampires" by the obnoxious Eric Sinclair, who places himself first in line to be her consort, proves to be the last straw.
 Undead and Unwed (Berkley, 2004)
 Undead and Unemployed (Berkley, 2004)
 Undead and Unappreciated (Berkley, 2005)
 Undead and Unreturnable (Berkley, 2005, hardback , paperback )
 Undead and Unpopular (Berkley, 2006, hardback , paperback )
 Undead and Uneasy (Berkley, 2007)
 Undead and Unworthy (Berkley, 2008)
 Undead and Unwelcome (Berkley, 2009)
 Undead and Unfinished (Berkley, 2010)
 Undead and Undermined (Berkley, 2011)
 Undead and Unstable (Berkley June 2012)
 Undead and Unsure (Berkley August 2013)
 Undead and Underwater (Berkley May 2013)
 Undead and Unwary  (Berkley October 2014)
 Undead and Unforgiven  (Berkley October 2015)
 Undead and Done  (Berkley October 2016)

The first four volumes have been reprinted as
 Betsy the Vampire Queen

Books 5-7 and Dead and Loving It have been reprinted as
 "Betsy: Bride of the Vampire"

Short stories have also appeared in:
 Cravings (Jove, 2004)
 Bite (Jove, 2004)
 Dead and Loving It (Berkley, 2006)
 Dead Over Heels (Berkley, 2008)

Wyndham Werewolves
 Love's Prisoner (novella in Secrets 6, Red Sage Publishing, Inc., 2000)
 Jared's Wolf (novella in Secrets 8, Red Sage Publishing, Inc., 2002)
 Derik's Bane (Berkley, 2005)
 Santa Claws (in Nicely Naughty, Loose-Id, 2004, a revised version of Naughty but Nice) This short story was included in Dead and Loving It.
 Speed Dating Werewolf Style Or, Ow, I Think You Broke The Bone (novella in Dead Over Heels, Berkley, 2008)
 Wolf at the Door (Oct 2011)
 Driftwood (Jan 2007)

Alaskan Royals
In an alternate reality, the series follows the royal Baranov family as they begin to look for love and marriage while ruling over Alaska (which was not purchased by the United States and became its own country). The series was limited to three books due to the end of the author's contract with Brava books.
 The Royal Treatment (Brava, 2002). The story revolves around Christina Krabbe and her life after meeting a king with an obsession for fishing and his penguin obsessed son. The series is set in alternate reality where Alaska was not sold to the United States, but instead formed into its own country and is governed by the Royal Baranov.
The Royal Pain (Brava, 2005). This time the focus is on HRH Princess Alexandria Baranov and her romance with Dr. Sheldon Rivers. It is found in 445 WorldCat libraries  
 The Royal Mess (Brava, 2007)

Fred the Mermaid
Fred has known since she was a small child that she is part Mermaid. It is only when the High Prince of the merfolk and a marine biologist fight for her heart does Fred's life get even more complicated.
 Sleeping with the Fishes, (November 2006). Half-mermaid Fred, 29, is a marine biologist working at the aquarium in Boston. Jonas, her thought-to-be-gay best friend, is the only one outside the family who knows the secret, until she is seen swimming in the fish tank by Thomas, a new employee at the aquarium. Prince Artur, a merman from the Black Sea, arrives to investigate the increased pollution in Boston Harbour and enlists the help of Fred and Thomas. Thomas and Prince Artur are rivals for Fred's affection, despite her abrasive manners and dismissive attitude to romance.
 Swimming Without a Net, (November 2007). Fred is again approached by the sea folk, but this time in order to participate in a ritual of sorts. The novel blends elements of supernatural and erotic fiction.
 Fish Out of Water, (November 2008)

All Three Books in One:
 Underwater Love 2012

The Gorgeous series
 Hello Gorgeous! (Kensington 2005)
 Drop Dead, Gorgeous! (Kensington 2006)

Jennifer Scales
The Jennifer Scales series, about a young weredragon, is written by MaryJanice Davidson and Anthony Alongi, her husband. These novels are currently being re-published as fantasy novels rather than young adult.
 Jennifer Scales and the Ancient Furnace Jennifer Scales and the Messenger of Light The Silver Moon Elm Jennifer Scales and The Seraph of Sorrow Rise of the Poison Moon EvangelinaCadence Jones
 Me, Myself and Why?, 2010
 Yours, Mine, and Ours, 2011
 You and I, Me and You, 2013

Insighter 
 Deja Who, 2016
 Deja New, 2017

Miscellaneous

Single authored
 By Any Other Name, 1998
 Adventures of the Teen Furies, 1998
 Dying for Ice Cream, 1999
 Escape The Slush Pile, 2001
 Thief of Hearts", 2001
 Naught or Nice, 2001
 Canis Royal: Bridefight, 2002
 Love Lies, 2002
 Under Cover, 2003
 Beggarman, Thief, 2004
 Really Unusual Bad Boys, 2005
 Dead and Loving It, April, 2006 - The collection includes the novellas: Santa Claws, Monster Love, There's no such thing as a Werewolf, A Fiend in need
 Doing It Right (novel), 2007
 Dead Over Heels, 2008
 Undead and Underwater an anthology (Berkley, 2013)
 The Love Scam, 2020Truth, Lies, and Second Dates (2020)

Multiple authors
 Secrets 6, 2000
 Reunions, 2000 written under Pen Name Janice Pohl
 Chicken Soup For The Soul, 2002)
 Secrets 8, 2002
 Lighthearted Lust, 2003
 Forgotten Wishes, 2004
 Men at Work, 2004
 Bad Boys with Expensive Toys, 2004
 How to Be a Wicked Woman, 2004
 Merry Christmas, Baby!, 2004
 Dead girls don`t dance Cravings, 2004
 The girl who was infatuated with death Bite, 2004
 Bewitched, Bothered and Be-Vampyred, 2005
 Perfect for the Beach, 2005
 Charming the Snake, 2005
 Kick Ass, 2005
 Wicked Woman Whodunit, 2005
 Romance at the Edge: In Other Worlds, 2005
 Really Unusual Bad Boys, 2005
 Valentine's Day is Killing Me, 2006
 Surf's Up, 2006
 Mysteria, 2006
 Over the Moon, 2007
 Demon's Delight, 2007
 No Rest for the Witches, 2007
 Mysteria Lane, 2008
 Faeries Gone Wild, 2009
Danger, Sweetheart, 2016

References

External links
 MaryJanice Davidson's Official Website
 MaryJanice Davidson at Paranormal Romance Writers
 MaryJanice Davidson at Fantastic Fiction
 MaryJanice Davidson's Official Group at Yahoo Groups

20th-century American novelists
21st-century American novelists
American fantasy writers
American romantic fiction writers
American women novelists
Living people
Urban fantasy writers
Women science fiction and fantasy writers
Place of birth missing (living people)
Women romantic fiction writers
20th-century American women writers
21st-century American women writers
Year of birth missing (living people)